State Route 12 (SR 12) is a state highway in the U.S. state of California that travels in an east–west direction from State Route 116 in Sebastopol in Sonoma County to State Route 49 just north of San Andreas in Calaveras County. The route connects the Sonoma and Napa valleys with the Sacramento–San Joaquin River Delta and the Sierra Foothills. It is constructed to freeway standards from the Fulton Road/South Wright Road stoplight in Santa Rosa, to its partial interchange with Farmers Lane (also in Santa Rosa).

Route description

There are six segments that are overlaps with other highways:  in the Napa and Sonoma valleys with SR 121, in the southern Napa Valley with SR 29, a short overlap with I-80 at Cordelia Junction in Fairfield, another short overlap with SR 99 in Lodi, and overlaps with SR 88 and SR 26 in the Sierra foothills. The highway is mainly two lane rural highway, with the exception of short segments in Santa Rosa and Fairfield/Suisun City, the overlaps with I-80 and SR 99, and segments within developed areas, such as Santa Rosa and Lodi.

SR 12 begins in the west at its junction with SR 116 in Sebastopol. After passing east through Santa Rosa on a mix of freeway, surface street, and expressway, it turns south into the Sonoma Valley, passing the Jack London State Historic Park at Glen Ellen. It winds through Sonoma on surface streets, where the historic Vallejo Estate and Sonoma Mission, both part of the Sonoma State Historic Park, are.

South of Sonoma, SR 12 turns east, joining SR 121 for nearly nine miles, then turns south briefly as it leaves SR 121 and joins the four-lane expressway SR 29 to cross the Napa River. Four miles after joining SR 29 it splits off towards the east on Jameson Canyon Road; this section is also the 1928 re-alignment of the Lincoln Highway, the first road across America. After a brief merge with Interstate 80, SR 12 branches off to the east as an expressway through Fairfield and Suisun City. East of Suisun it becomes two lanes again and crosses south of Travis Air Force Base, through rolling fields with numerous wind turbines. Just past Braid's Bridge is the Western Railway Museum. At Rio Vista, SR 12 crosses the Helen Madere Memorial Bridge over the Sacramento River, entering the California Delta.

This stretch of the river has twice been the site of much-publicized inland excursions by humpback whales, presumably veering off course while making their annual migrations along the Pacific coast. In 1985 Humphrey the whale swam about as far as the Rio Vista Bridge. In 2007 a humpback mother and calf dubbed Delta and Dawn circled for several days just upstream of the bridge, seemingly reluctant to pass under it again after having spent the previous three or four weeks upriver near Sacramento.

From the Sacramento River to the junction with Interstate 5, SR 12 crosses several of the waterways of the California Delta and the low-lying fields between them.  Through Lodi it becomes a wide four-lane business route. After another brief merger with another freeway, this time SR 99, SR 12 heads east into the Sierra foothills (with shared segments with SR 88 and SR 26) before ending at the junction with SR 49 just north of San Andreas.

SR 12 is part of the California Freeway and Expressway System, and in Sebastopol, from US 101 to Sonoma, and from I-80 to SR 88 is part of the National Highway System, a network of highways that are considered essential to the country's economy, defense, and mobility by the Federal Highway Administration. SR 12 is eligible to be included in the State Scenic Highway System; however, it is only designated as a scenic highway from its intersection with Danielli Avenue east of Santa Rosa to its junction with London Way near Agua Caliente, meaning that it is a substantial section of highway passing through a "memorable landscape" with no "visual intrusions", where the potential designation has gained popular favor with the community.

SR 12 has been designated by various state laws and through local usage as the Valley of the Moon Scenic Route (the portion running through Sonoma County, though the first sign with this name is at the intersection of Farmers Lane and Fourth Street in Santa Rosa); Luther Burbank Memorial Highway from Santa Rosa to Sebastopol (after botanist Luther Burbank).
SR 12 is also known as Sonoma Highway between Santa Rosa and the west side of the city of Sonoma; 
Broadway between Sonoma Plaza and its junction with SR 121 in Schellville; 
Carneros Highway for the length of its concurrency with 121 between Schellville and its junction and the north end of its concurrency with SR 29 near Napa; 
Jameson Canyon Road from where its concurrency with SR 29 ends in American Canyon to its junction with I-80 in Cordelia; 
and Rio Vista Highway from I-80 to SR 160 east of Rio Vista, and informally as "Blood Alley" from Lodi to Fairfield. The segment through Lodi to the overlap with SR 99 is on Kettleman Lane.

History

Before the 1964 renumbering, this route was signed as Sign Route 12 for most of its length. However, SR 12 was designated as Legislative Route 51 (LR 51) from SR 116 to SR 121 before the 1964 renumbering. Portions of the route from SR 29 to I-80 ran concurrently with State Route 29 or with State Route 37; this was also LR 8 and a former routing of US 40. The portion from I-80 to then-US 99 was designated as LR 53 in 1919; from US 99 to SR 49, it was designated as LR 24.

In 1976, the discontinuity resulting from the concurrency with State Route 84 was removed.

In January 1996, photographer Charles O'Rear pulled off the highway east of Schellville near the Napa–Sonoma county line to photograph the lush hillside by the road. The image became known as Bliss and was used as the default computer wallpaper of Microsoft's Windows XP operating system.

Future extension
Plans call for a western extension of its western terminus to State Route 1 near Bodega Bay. Plans also called for Route 12 to be built as a freeway from Farmers Lane to Melita Road, in Santa Rosa; however, as of 2014, this project was delayed due to community opposition.

Major intersections

See also

References

External links

California @ AARoads.com – State Route 12
Caltrans: Route 12 highway conditions
California Highways: Route 12

012
012
State Route 012
State Route 012
State Route 012
State Route 012
State Route 012
State Route 012
012
U.S. Route 40